Critot is a commune in the Seine-Maritime department in the Normandy region in northern France.

Geography
The A28 autoroute borders the commune to the east.

Population

Places of interest
 The church of St.Martin, dating from the seventeenth century.

See also
Communes of the Seine-Maritime department

References

External links

Official website of Critot 

Communes of Seine-Maritime